The Samba Purana is one of the Saura Upapuranas. This text is dedicated to Surya. The recension of the text found in the printed editions has 84 chapters. Chapters 53-68 of this text are also divided into 15 s.

Content 

Samba Purana is a text dedicated to the worship of Surya, the god of the sun. This text comprises a number of narratives dealing with creation, details of solar system, eclipses, geography of the earth, description of Surya and his attendants, construction of images of these deities, details of yoga, manners and customs, rites and rituals, recitations of mantras, and dāna (generosity).

After the customary beginning in Chapter 1, the text consists the narrative of Krishna's son Samba being infected by leprosy after being cursed by sage Durvasa, and subsequently being cured by worshipping Surya in the temple constructed by him in Mitravana on the banks of the Chandrabhaga at what was Multan Sun Temple. This whole narrative is presented as a conversation between the king Brihadbala of Ikshvaku dynasty and the sage Vashishtha.

In Chapter two, Samba, a son of Krishna was cursed to be afflicted by leprosy. In chapter 5, Samba was then advised by Narada to worship Surya. In Chapter 14, Samba engaged himself in tapas, meditating on Surya at Mitravan (identified by scholars as Multan) which came to be called Sambapur. In chapter 16, Samba discovered an idol of Surya midstream in Chandrabhaga (Chinab) river.

He is then told in chapter 27 that only the Maga Brahmins in Shakadvipa are capable of worshiping the idol of Surya. Samba then went to Shakadvipa and fetched Maga Brahmins to worship Surya. The Maga are described as reciting the Vedas in a mysterious way, they wear avayanga. They drink homa juice. Samba brought 18 families from Shakadvipa, flying on the divine bird Garuda. The image of Surya explained that it was crafted in Shakadvipa itself, and eventually arrived at Mitravan. Much of the text is devoted to rituals associated with Sun worship.

History 
R.C. Hazra in his Studies in the Upapuranas dates Samba Purana between 650-850 CE. The text in Brāhmaparvan of the Bhavishya Purana is largely taken from the Samba Purana which is regarded to be older.

Govindpur Inscription of Poet Gangadhar 
An inscription of Saka 1059 (1137-38 CE) was discovered by Cunningham at Govindpur in the Nawada division of the Gaya district. It gives the account of Maga Brahmins being invited by Samba. The scholarly family of Gangadhar belonged to a clan of Maga Brahmins. The inscription confirms that the tradition existed before Saka 1059, confirming the antiquity of the text of Samba Purana. The Gaya region is a major center of the Shakadwipiya Brahmins who use local village names as the exogamous divisions of their community.

References

Bibliography 

  
 
 
 
 
 
 
 
 

Puranas
Surya
Soma (drink)
History of Multan